The Sony Glasstron was a family of portable head-mounted displays, first released in 1996 with the model PLM-50. The products included two LCD screens and two earphones for video and audio respectively. These products are no longer manufactured nor supported by Sony.

The Glasstron was not the first head-mounted display by Sony, with the Visortron being a previous exhibited unit. The Sony HMZ-T1, HMZ-T2, HMZ-T3, PlayStation VR and PlayStation VR 2 can be considered successors to Glasstron. The head-mounted display developed for Sony during the mid-1990s by Virtual i-o is completely unrelated to the Glasstron.

One application of this technology was in the game MechWarrior 2, which permitted users to adopt a visual perspective from inside the cockpit of the craft, using their own eyes as visual and seeing the battlefield through their craft's own cockpit.

Models 
Five models were released. Supported video inputs included PC (15 pin, VGA interface), Composite and S-Video. A brief list of the models follows:

References

Sony products
Display technology
Eyewear
Products introduced in 1996
Computer peripherals
Head-mounted displays